His Majesty's Diplomatic Service (HMDS) is the diplomatic service of the United Kingdom of Great Britain and Northern Ireland, dealing with foreign affairs and representing British interests overseas, as opposed to the Home Civil Service, which deals with domestic affairs. It employs around 14,000 people, roughly one-third of whom are crown servants working directly for the Foreign, Commonwealth and Development Office, either in London or abroad. The remaining two thirds of staff are employed locally by one of nearly 270 British diplomatic missions abroad (such as embassies, consulates or high commissions). The Permanent Under-Secretary of State for Foreign Affairs is also the Head of the Diplomatic Service.

The Foreign Service, which originally provided civil servants to staff the Foreign Office, was once a separate service, but it amalgamated with the Diplomatic Service in 1918. The Diplomatic Service also absorbed the Colonial Service in the late 1960s.

Women were not allowed to join the Diplomatic Service until 1946. Until 1973, they were required to leave when they married. The first female ambassador to be appointed was Barbara Salt, to Israel in 1962, but ill-health prevented her from taking up the post.  Eleanor Emery was British High Commissioner to Botswana from 1973 to 1977, corresponding to an ambassador but within the Commonwealth. The first woman to serve as an ambassador as such was Anne Warburton, appointed to Denmark in 1976.

See also
Diplomatic ranks in the British Diplomatic Service
List of diplomatic missions of the United Kingdom
His Majesty's Home Civil Service
High commissioner (Commonwealth)
Colonial Service

Footnotes

External links
Foreign, Commonwealth and Development Office website

Diplomatic Service
Diplomatic Service
Diplomacy
United Kingdom
Diplomatic security